René François Joseph Roy (1894–1977) was a French economist. He is primarily recognized for the contribution now known as Roy's identity. One of the pioneer econometricians  in France who was leading the econometrics seminar in Paris for many years.

He was the president of the Econometric Society in 1953 replacing Paul Samuelson.

Biography 
René Roy graduated from École polytechnique in 1914 and entered Corps of Bridges and Roads. He defended his doctoral dissertation in law in 1925.

René Roy was injured in Chemin des Dames during the World War I when he was only 23 years old and become subsequently blind.

He held the post of the Chair of Econometrics in Paris Institute of Statistics starting from 1931.

Publications 
 
 
 
 
 
 
 
 
 
 
 
 
 
 
 
 
 

1894 births
1977 deaths
French economists
Fellows of the Econometric Society
Presidents of the Econometric Society